South Solon Meetinghouse is a historic church building in south central Solon, Maine.  Built in 1842, it is a remarkably fine example of Gothic Revival architecture in a rural setting.  It was listed on the National Register of Historic Places in 1980.  The building is now owned by a non-profit organization and operated as a community function space.

Description and history
It is a single-story wood frame structure, with a gable roof and clapboard siding. A squat single-stage square tower rises above the main (east-facing) facade, consisting of a belfry with Gothic-arched louvered openings, and pinnacles at the corners above. The main facade is symmetrically arranged, with a pair of entrance flanking a tall central window, all three elements topped by Gothic-arched panels. The sides of the building each have three similar windows.

The original box pews, pulpit and choir loft gallery are still in place.  The interior of the South Solon Meeting House was elaborately painted between 1952 and 1957 by 13 artists from the nearby Skowhegan School of Painting and Sculpture.  The artwork inside this building features a painting technique called buon fresco which has been taught at the Skowhegan School since its foundation.  Some of the artists involved in this fresco project are  William King, Ashley Bryan, Sidney Hurwitz, John Wallace, Sigmund Abeles, Tom Mikkelson, and Edwin Brooks.

See also
National Register of Historic Places listings in Somerset County, Maine

References

External links
 Article
 Mills Whitaker Architects - restoration project with photos

Event venues on the National Register of Historic Places in Maine
Gothic Revival church buildings in Maine
Churches completed in 1842
Churches in Somerset County, Maine
Tourist attractions in Somerset County, Maine
National Register of Historic Places in Somerset County, Maine
1842 establishments in Maine